Jacques Dohen (4 May 1930 – 9 May 2005) was a French hurdler. He competed in the men's 110 metres hurdles at the 1952 Summer Olympics.

References

External links
 

1930 births
2005 deaths
Athletes (track and field) at the 1952 Summer Olympics
French male hurdlers
Olympic athletes of France
Place of birth missing
Mediterranean Games silver medalists for France
Mediterranean Games medalists in athletics
Athletes (track and field) at the 1955 Mediterranean Games
20th-century French people